Matthew Forgues (born April 17, 1992)  is an American racewalker. Forgues earned gold for the 50 kilometres race walk at the 2019 USA Outdoor Track and Field Championships. Forgues was runner up in the 50 km walk at the 2020 United States Olympic Trials in Santee, California in a time of 4:14:42.

Early life and education 
Forgues was born on April 17, 1992 in from Boothbay, Maine, to Linda and Michael Forgues. He began racewalking at seven years old. His older sister Lauren is also a racewalker.

Forgues attended Boothbay Region High School. He earned a bachelor's degree in psychology from Goucher College in 2014. While at Goucher, Forgues studied abroad in Santiago, Chile, where he ran in the Santiago Marathon.

Career 
In 2010, Forgues earned a spot on the U.S. junior national racewalk team. In 2011, Forgues came in fourth in NAIA's 5,000-meter championships. He placed fifth in the 50 kilometer race walk at the 2015 USA Outdoor Track and Field Championships. At the 2016 USA Outdoor Track and Field Championships, he placed fourth. He earned third at the same event in 2017. In September 2017, Forgues won the 40 kilometer racewalk at the National Championships. Forgues earned silver for the 50 kilometres race walk at the 2018 USA Outdoor Track and Field Championships. In an international competition in Monterrey, Mexico, he came in 8th place. In January 2019, Forgues won his first 50km National title at the 2019 USA 50km Race Walk Championships. Forgues is currently training for the 2020 Summer Olympics.

After college graduation, Forgues taught at Standing Rock Indian Reservation where he resumed racewalking. He is a full-time educator at Whole Foods Market in San Diego.

Achievements

Personal life 
Forgues ran a marathon in New York. He is gay and married to Manuel Martinez. He is lactose intolerant.

References

American male racewalkers
Living people
21st-century American educators
People from Boothbay, Maine
Goucher College alumni
American male marathon runners
1992 births
Athletes (track and field) at the 2019 Pan American Games
Pan American Games track and field athletes for the United States
Gay sportsmen
LGBT people from Maine
American LGBT sportspeople